Christian Samuel Theodor Bernd (April 12, 1775 in Meseritz – August 26, 1854 in Bonn) was a German linguist and heraldist, one of the founders of scientific heraldry.

Bernd studied theology at the Jena University. Between 1807 and 1811 he served as editor of the dictionary of German language, then he was a librarian in Breslau. He was the professor of diplomatics, sphragistics and heraldry at the Bonn University from 1822 and was one of the founders of modern scientific heraldry.

Bernd introduced hatching for some additional tinctures such as Umbra, Rotgelb, Stahlblau and Blutfarbe.

Works 
Allgemeine Schriftenkunde der sogenannten Wappenwissenschaft. I-II. Bonn, 1830
Das Wappenwesen der griechen und Römer. Bonn, 1841
Die Haupstücke der Wappenwissenschaft. Bonn, 1841-1849
Wappenbuch der preußischen Rheinprovinz Bonn, 1835, supplement Bonn, 1842
Handbuch der Wappenwissenschaft. Leipzig, 1856

See also 
Hatching system

1775 births
1854 deaths
Academic staff of the University of Bonn
People from Międzyrzecz
German heraldists